The coat of arms of Ivory Coast in its current form was adopted in 1964. The focal point of the emblem is the head of an elephant. The elephant is symbolically important to the nation, since it is the largest animal found in Ivory Coast as well as being the source of ivory for which the nation is named.  The rising sun is a traditional symbol of a new beginning.  Below the elephant head is a banner containing the name of the nation.

Official 1964 decree 
The decree n° 64-237 of 26 June 1964, modifying the decree n° 60-78 of 8 February 1960 establishing the coat of arms of the Republic of Ivory Coast, defines in its second article the coat of arms as follows : "On an escutcheon Vert an elephant's head, the shield surmounted by an issuant eclipsed sun Or radiating of nine part Or. At dexter and sinister two trees Or and the Argent inscription « République de Côte d'Ivoire » on Or strip.".

Therefore, this decree states that the coat of arms of Côte d'Ivoire is composed of six elements:
 The elephant's head;
 The golden rising sun;
 The two golden palm trees;
 The green escutcheon (at the creation of the coat of arms of February 8, 1960, the escutcheon was Azure);
 The golden strip;
 The Argent "République de Côte d'Ivoire" inscription on the strip.

The Coat of arms of the Republic act :
 As a means of identification for the Republic and its institutions. For this purpose, it must be placed on all official documents in the middle top or in the upper right corner, as a stamp;
 As a means of education, a call for unity and solidarity against all adversity. Historically, the designers of the coat of arms were inspired by natural elements symbolizing the main political parties during the colonial period, the elephant representing the PDCI and the trees the former progressive party.

Evolutions from 1960 to today 
The coat of arms of the Republic of Ivory Coast has evolved between 1960 and today. As defined by governmental decree, only the arms of 1964 should be used, except in the context of a non-official historical subject. The use of arms other than those of 1964, reaffirmed in 2011 and still in force, is considered incorrect.

Non-official deviations

References 

National symbols of Ivory Coast
Ivory Coast
Ivorian coats of arms
Ivory Coast
Ivory Coast
Ivory Coast
Ivory Coast
1964 establishments in Ivory Coast